Swar Khan also known as Swatkhan Bahar (born c. 1970) is a citizen of Afghanistan, who was held in extrajudicial detention in the United States's Guantanamo Bay detention camps, in Cuba.

Khan was a security official for the Hamid Karzai government prior to his capture.   
His boss told reporters that his capture was due to false denunciations from a jealous rival, whose sons worked as interpreters for the Americans, and that he had tried to tell the Americans he should be set free—without success.

Writ of habeas corpus

Khan had a writ of habeas corpus, Swat Khan v. Bush, filed on his behalf in 2005.
He was represented by James Wyda and Martin Bahl, Federal Public Defenders in Maryland.

Repatriation
Khan was transferred to Afghanistan on Oct. 11, 2006.

McClatchy interview
On June 15, 2008 the McClatchy News Service published articles based on interviews with 66 former Guantanamo detainees. McClatchy reporters interviewed Khan.

Tom Lasseter, the lead McClatchy reporter, wrote that while his Tribunal President ruled that even though he had offered their phone numbers the witnesses he requested were not reasonably available but McClatchy reporters "had little trouble" phoning his boss at the Interior Ministry, Mohammed Mustafa. Mustafa confirmed he had been falsely denounced by a rival in the Afghan security services. 

Khan told about being beaten in Bagram, and being hung from the ceiling by his wrists in an isolation cell.

Khan described making two suicide attempts in Guantanamo.  
Following his repatriation the Governor of his Province offered him another position as a Police officer, but he declined.

See also
 Bagram torture and prisoner abuse
 Guantanamo Bay detention camp suicide attempts

References

External links
 The Guantánamo Files: Website Extras (12) – The Last of the Afghans (Part Two) Andy Worthington

Afghan extrajudicial prisoners of the United States
Living people
1970 births
Guantanamo detainees known to have been released
Year of birth uncertain
People from Khost
Bagram Theater Internment Facility detainees